Sabayevo (Habay) is a rural locality (a village) in Kovardinsky Selsoviet, Gafuriysky District, Bashkortostan, Russia. The population was 177 as of 2010. There are 4 streets.

Geography 
Sabayevo is located 54 km north of Krasnousolsky (the district's administrative centre) by road. Novye Kovardy is the nearest rural locality.

References 

Rural localities in Gafuriysky District